Stars and the Moon is the ninth studio album by Japanese jazz fusion band T-Square, who were then known as The Square. It was released on December 1, 1984.

Track listing
Sources

References

T-Square (band) albums
1984 albums